Maturitas is a monthly peer-reviewed medical journal covering midlife and post-reproductive health. It was established in 1978 and is the official journal of the European Menopause and Andropause Society; it is also affiliated with the Australasian Menopause Society. It is published by Elsevier and the editors-in-chief are Irene Lambrinoudaki and Leon Flicker. According to the Journal Citation Reports, the journal has a 2020 impact factor of 4.342.

References

External links 

Obstetrics and gynaecology journals
Elsevier academic journals
Publications established in 1978
Monthly journals
English-language journals